Longreef is an Australian rock band from  Sydney, formed in 2010. The band consists of Josh Barker (vocals/guitar), Nick Miller (guitar), Tristan Davies (drums), and Jim Wark (bass/vocals). The band released their self-titled debut EP in 2011 and their second EP entitled "Dirty Motel" in 2012, which features their Active Rock radio singles "Dirty Motel" and "She Likes The Ladies" featured on Octane (Sirius XM). The band performs over 200 shows a year in the United States and was named one of DeliRadio's Hardest Touring Artists of 2013. The band supports the Ronald McDonald House Charities by donating 10 cents for every mile travelled.

Band members 

Current members
Josh Barker  – Lead vocals, guitar
Nick Miller – Lead guitar
Jim Wark - Bass, backing vocals
Tristan Davies – Drums

Tours 

 Toured with Minneapolis-based rock band 3 Pill Morning in Fall 2013.
 Has shared stage with rock bands Hoobastank, Sick Puppies, Bush, Thirty Seconds to Mars, Stone Temple Pilots, Seether, and Taproot.

Discography

Studio albums

Singles 

 "Lonely" (2011) 
 Reached #33 on Billboard's Top 40 R&R Indicator Chart
 "Dirty Motel" (2012)
 "She Likes The Ladies" (2013)
 "Battle Plan" (2014)

References

External links 
 Official Website

Australian pop music groups
Australian rock music groups
Musical groups from Sydney